Carl "Goggi" von Haartman (6 July 1897, Helsinki, Finland – 27 August 1980, El Alamillo, Spain) was a Finnish lieutenant colonel, writer, film actor, and film director.

In the late 1920s, Haartman lived in the United States and worked in Hollywood. He played the Zeppelin commander in Hell's Angels (1930) directed by Howard Hughes and starring Jean Harlow. He fought in the Finnish Civil War for the White Guard, in the Spanish Civil War for the Nationalist side, and for Finnish Army in the Winter War and Continuation War.

His daughter and her family currently live in Spain.

Partial filmography
 Hotel Imperial (1927)
 Very Confidential (1927)
 The Awakening (1928)
 Hell's Angels (1930)

References

External links

1897 births
1980 deaths
Writers from Helsinki
People from Uusimaa Province (Grand Duchy of Finland)
Swedish-speaking Finns
Finnish people of German descent
Finnish Army personnel
People of the Finnish Civil War (White side)
Finnish people of the Spanish Civil War
Finnish military personnel of World War II
Finnish male film actors
Finnish male silent film actors
20th-century Finnish male actors
Male actors from Helsinki
Finnish expatriates in the United States
Finnish emigrants to Spain